Macara argentea is a moth of the family Megalopygidae. It was described by Herbert Druce in 1897. It is found in Panama and Ecuador.

The forewings and hindwings are pure white. The forewings crossed from the costal to the inner margin by two broad bands of silvery scales, the outer margin edged with silver.

References

Moths described in 1897
Megalopygidae